The Lac Lanoraye is a fresh water body whose discharge spills into the rivière du Malin, in the unorganized territory of Lac-Jacques-Cartier, in the La Côte-de-Beaupré Regional County Municipality, in the administrative region of Capitale-Nationale, in province of Quebec, in Canada.

The area of this lake is served by a few secondary roads for the needs of forestry and recreational tourism activities.

Forestry is the main economic activity in the sector; recreational tourism, second.

The surface of Lac Lanoraye is generally frozen from the beginning of December to the end of March, but the safe circulation on the ice is generally made from mid-December to mid-March.

Geography 
This lake encased between the mountains looks like a rectangle with rounded corners. This lake has a peninsula attached to the eastern shore stretching west towards the island.

From the mouth of Lake Lanoraye, the current descends on  following the course of the rivière du Malin. Then the current follows the course of the Jacques-Cartier River on  generally south to the northeast bank of the St. Lawrence River.

Toponymy 
The toponym "Lac Lanoraye" was formalized on December 5, 1968, by the Commission de toponymie du Québec.

Notes and references

External link 
 Jacques-Cartier National Park

See also 
 Laurentides Wildlife Reserve
 La Côte-de-Beaupré Regional County Municipality (MRC)
 Lac-Jacques-Cartier, a TNO
 Rivière du Malin
 Jacques-Cartier River
 List of lakes of Canada

Rivers of Capitale-Nationale
La Côte-de-Beaupré Regional County Municipality